The 1998 Coppa Italia Final was the final of the 1997–98 Coppa Italia, the 51st season of the top cup competition in Italian football. The match was played over two legs on 8 and 29 April 1998 between Milan and Lazio. The final was won by Lazio, who claimed their second Coppa Italia title with a 3–2 aggregate victory.

First leg

Second leg

Coppa Italia Finals
Coppa Italia Final 1998
Coppa Italia Final 1998